Noccaea is a problematic genus of flowering plants in the family Brassicaceae, native to temperate areas of western North America, southern South America, northern Africa, Europe and Asia.

Species
Currently accepted species include:

Noccaea abchasica (F.K.Mey.) Al-Shehbaz
Noccaea aghrica (P.H.Davis & Kit Tan) Firat & Özüdogru
Noccaea alpestris (Jacq.) Kerguélen
Noccaea amani (Post) F.K.Mey.
Noccaea andersonii (Hook.f. & Thomson) Al-Shehbaz
Noccaea angustifolia F.K.Mey.
Noccaea annua (K.Koch) F.K.Mey.
Noccaea antitaurica (F.K.Mey.) Al-Shehbaz
Noccaea apterocarpa (Rech.f. & Aellen) Al-Shehbaz & Menke
Noccaea arctica (A.E.Porsild) Holub
Noccaea atlantica (Batt.) Al-Shehbaz
Noccaea banatica (R.Uechtr.) F.K.Mey.
Noccaea bellidifolia (Griseb.) F.K.Mey.
Noccaea birolmutlui Özgisi & Özüdogru
Noccaea boeotica F.K.Mey.
Noccaea boissieri (Bornm.) D.A.German
Noccaea borealis F.K.Mey.
Noccaea bornmuelleri (Rech.f.) Al-Shehbaz
Noccaea bourgaei (Boiss.) D.A.German
Noccaea bovis (F.K.Mey.) Al-Shehbaz
Noccaea brevistyla (DC.) Steud.
Noccaea bulbosa (Spruner ex Boiss.) Al-Shehbaz
Noccaea caerulescens (J.Presl & C.Presl) F.K.Mey.
Noccaea caespitosa (Boiss.) Al-Shehbaz & Menke
Noccaea camlikensis Aytaç, Nordt & Parolly
Noccaea campylophylla (F.K.Mey.) Al-Shehbaz
Noccaea cappadocica (Boiss. & Balansa) Al-Shehbaz
Noccaea capricornuta (F.K.Mey.) Al-Shehbaz
Noccaea cariensis (Carlström) Parolly, Nordt & Aytaç
Noccaea cepaeifolia (Wulfen) Rchb.
Noccaea cilicica (Schott & Kotschy ex Boiss.) Al-Shehbaz
Noccaea cochleariformis (DC.) Á.Löve & D.Löve
Noccaea cochlearioides (Hook.f. & Thomson) Al-Shehbaz
Noccaea cornuticarpa (Naqshi) Al-Shehbaz
Noccaea corymbosa (J.Gay) F.K.Mey.
Noccaea cretica (Degen & Jáv.) F.K.Mey.
Noccaea cypria (Bornm.) F.K.Mey.
Noccaea dacica (Heuff.) F.K.Mey.
Noccaea densiflora (Boiss. & Kotschy) F.K.Mey.
Noccaea dolichocarpa (Zohary) Al-Shehbaz
Noccaea eburneosa F.K.Mey.
Noccaea edinensium F.K.Mey.
Noccaea eigii (Zohary) Al-Shehbaz
Noccaea elegans (Boiss.) Al-Shehbaz
Noccaea epirota (Halácsy) F.K.Mey.
Noccaea fendleri (A.Gray) Holub
Noccaea ferganensis (N.Busch) Czerep.
Noccaea flagellifera (O.E.Schulz) Al-Shehbaz
Noccaea freynii (N.Busch) Czerep.
Noccaea gardeziana F.K.Mey.
Noccaea germanii Al-Shehbaz
Noccaea goesingensis (Halácsy) F.K.Mey.
Noccaea graeca (Jord.) F.K.Mey.
Noccaea × gremliana (Thell.) F.K.Mey.
Noccaea griffithiana (Boiss.) F.K.Mey.
Noccaea haussknechtii (Boiss.) F.K.Mey.
Noccaea huber-morathii (F.K.Mey.) Al-Shehbaz
Noccaea iberidea (Boiss.) Al-Shehbaz & Menke
Noccaea iranica Al-Shehbaz
Noccaea jankae (A.Kern.) F.K.Mey.
Noccaea japonica (H.Boissieu) F.K.Mey.
Noccaea jaubertii (Hedge) Al-Shehbaz
Noccaea kovatsii (Heuff.) F.K.Mey.
Noccaea kurdica (Hedge) Al-Shehbaz
Noccaea leblebicii (Gemici & Görk) Raus
Noccaea libanotica F.K.Mey.
Noccaea lilacina (Boiss. & A.Huet) Al-Shehbaz
Noccaea limosellifolia (Reut. ex Burnat) F.K.Mey.
Noccaea lutescens (Velen.) F.K.Mey.
Noccaea maassoumii (Mozaff.) Al-Shehbaz
Noccaea macrantha (Lipsky) F.K.Mey.
Noccaea magellanica (Pers.) Holub
Noccaea mexicana (Standl.) Holub
Noccaea meyeri Al-Shehbaz
Noccaea microphylla (Boiss. & Orph.) F.K.Mey.
Noccaea microstyla (Boiss.) F.K.Mey.
Noccaea minima (Ard.) F.K.Mey.
Noccaea montana (L.) F.K.Mey.
Noccaea natolica (Boiss.) Al-Shehbaz
Noccaea nepalensis Al-Shehbaz
Noccaea nevadensis (Boiss. & Reut.) F.K.Mey.
Noccaea ochroleuca (Boiss. & Heldr.) F.K.Mey.
Noccaea oppositifolia (Pers.) Al-Shehbaz & Menke
Noccaea orbiculata (Steven ex DC.) Al-Shehbaz
Noccaea oxyceras (Boiss.) Al-Shehbaz
Noccaea papillosa (Boiss.) F.K.Mey.
Noccaea papyracea (Boiss.) Khosravi, Mumm. & Mohsenz.
Noccaea parviflora (A.Nelson) Holub
Noccaea perfoliata (L.) Al-Shehbaz
Noccaea phrygia (Bornm.) F.K.Mey.
Noccaea platycarpa (Fisch., C.A.Mey. & N.Busch) Al-Shehbaz
Noccaea praecox (Wulfen) F.K.Mey.
Noccaea pulvinata (F.K.Mey.) Al-Shehbaz
Noccaea pumila (Steven) Steud.
Noccaea rechingeri (F.K.Mey.) Al-Shehbaz
Noccaea rhodopensis F.K.Mey.
Noccaea rostrata (N.Busch) Al-Shehbaz
Noccaea rosularis (Boiss. & Balansa) Al-Shehbaz
Noccaea rotundifolia (L.) Moench
Noccaea rubescens (Schott & Kotschy ex Tchich.) F.K.Mey.
Noccaea sarmatica F.K.Mey.
Noccaea sintenisii (Hausskn. ex Bornm.) F.K.Mey.
Noccaea stenocarpa (Boiss.) Al-Shehbaz
Noccaea stenoptera (Boiss. & Reut.) F.K.Mey.
Noccaea stilosa (Ten.) Rchb.
Noccaea swatensis F.K.Mey.
Noccaea sylvia (Gaudin) F.K.Mey.
Noccaea szowitsiana (Boiss.) Al-Shehbaz
Noccaea tatianae (Bordz.) F.K.Mey.
Noccaea tenuis (Boiss. & Buhse) F.K.Mey.
Noccaea thlaspidioides (Pall.) F.K.Mey.
Noccaea triangularis (F.K.Mey.) Al-Shehbaz
Noccaea trinervia (DC.) Steud.
Noccaea tymphaea (Hausskn.) F.K.Mey.
Noccaea umbellata (F.K.Mey.) Al-Shehbaz
Noccaea valerianoides (Rech.f.) F.K.Mey.
Noccaea venusta (Schischk.) D.A.German
Noccaea versicolor (Stoj. & Kitan.) F.K.Mey.
Noccaea vesicaria (L.) Al-Shehbaz
Noccaea violascens (Schott & Kotschy) F.K.Mey.
Noccaea viridisepala (Podp.) F.K.Mey.
Noccaea wendelboi (Rech.f.) F.K.Mey.
Noccaea yunnanensis (Franch.) Al-Shehbaz
Noccaea zaffranii F.K.Mey.
Noccaea zangezurica (Tzvelev) Al-Shehbaz

References

Brassicaceae
Brassicaceae genera